Lakewood Cemetery is a large private, non-sectarian cemetery located in Minneapolis, Minnesota, United States.  It is located at 3600 Hennepin Avenue at the southern end of the Uptown area.  It is noted for its chapel which is on the National Register of Historic Places and was modeled after the Hagia Sophia in Istanbul, Turkey.

History
About 250 acres in size, Lakewood memorializes the dead with more than 200,000 monuments, markers and memorializations.  Long considered one of the most beautiful cemeteries in the country, it was modeled after the rural cemeteries of 19th-century France, such as Père-Lachaise in Paris. When Lakewood was established in 1871 rural cemeteries were becoming more popular as part of a growing trend away from churchyard burials in the heart of the city.

In July 1871 Colonel William S. King, local businessman and newspaper publisher, proposed to community leaders of the city that they work together to establish a cemetery "on some of the beautiful locations out near the lakes, where the encroachments of the city would never seriously interfere." In August of the same year a meeting was held for establishing the Lyndale Cemetery Association (Changed to Lakewood in Feb of 1872).  According to the minutes of the original meeting recorded by Thomas Lowry, "that after an examination of various localities they had chosen the land owned by William S. King lying between Lakes Calhoun and Harriet." Colonel King agreed to sell his land for the purpose at a cost of $21,000, "to be paid back over a year at 7 percent interest." The first trustees voted to raise $25,000 to purchase the land and make improvements at a time when the cost of a home in Minneapolis was about $500. The money was raised by selling 250 shares of stock at $100 a piece, two-thirds of which was purchased by the trustees themselves. The remaining balance was solicited by a committee and sold to other local investors. In April 1872 Superintendent A.B. Barton and the board of trustees employed C. W. Folsom, Superintendent of Mount Auburn Cemetery in Cambridge, Massachusetts to develop plans for the new cemetery.  In October 1872 the Association reacquired all stocks that had been sold to the public.

The public dedication of Lakewood was held on September 16, 1872, with "a large number of lots being selected at the close of the exercise by the citizens present." Many of the earliest lots sold in the 1870s-1880s remained unused until 1972 when they were reclaimed for resale to the public.  The first person buried in Lakewood Cemetery was Maggie Menzel who died on January 24, 1872, at the age of nineteen.

Architect Harry Wild Jones designed the cemetery's chapel which began construction in August 1908. Built of the finest materials, the chapel seats about 200 and is renowned for its beauty and superb acoustics. The dome is 65 feet high with 24 stained glass windows inset its full circumference. Charles R. Lamb of New York orchestrated the design of the chapel's interior mosaic artwork. Six highly skilled artists of Italy were enlisted to create 10 million tessellae in Venice, which were then shipped to Lakewood, where those same artists performed the arduous task of assembling them in the chapel's interior.  Completed in 1910, the chapel's total cost of construction was $150,000. Lakewood Chapel was added to the National Register of Historic Places on October 20, 1983.

Cremation services were begun in 1910 and have continued to the present day. In 1965-67 a community mausoleum and columbarium was built with enough space for over 5000 crypts and niches. One of the building's more notable features are the 24 eight-foot stained glass windows by Willet Stained Glass Studios of Philadelphia. A large reflecting pool just outside the mausoleum's east side extends toward the garden crypt area and Lakewood's historic chapel nearby.

In 2012, a new Garden Mausoleum, designed by HGA Architects of Minneapolis, was opened alongside the reflecting pool, adding a further 879 crypts and 4,620 cremation niches.

Since its inception in 1872 Lakewood has continued to operate as a non-profit, non-denominational cemetery providing funeral services to the public. Many Minneapolis streets, parks, and monuments bear the names of the Lakewood's original founders — Thomas Lowry, William D. Washburn, and Charles M. Loring, to name a few. The cemetery itself memorializes many notable persons, including former Vice President Hubert H. Humphrey, Civil War General Lewis A. Grant, and Senator Paul Wellstone who was killed in a plane crash in 2002.

Notable burials

Albert Abdallah (1878-1968), founder of Abdallah Candies
Cedric Adams (1902-1961), Journalist and radio personality of Minnesota
Buzz Arlett (1899-1964), American baseball player, sometimes known as the "Babe Ruth of the minor leagues."
William F. Beck (August 28, 1904 – October 24, 1966), Bible translator
Robert Sirelle Brown, first black doctor
Curt Carlson (1914-1999), founder of Radisson Hotels
John Crosby (1828-1887), founder of the Washburn-Crosby Company, the forerunner to General Mills
H. David Dalquist (1918-2005), inventor of the Bundt pan, and founder of Nordic Ware
Ron Daws (1937-1992), one of three USA 1968 Mexico Olympic Marathon racers; finished 22nd
George Dayton (1857-1938), founder of Dayton Dry Goods, which became Target Corporation
William Hood Dunwoody (1841-1914), businessman, and Kate L. Dunwoody, founders of Dunwoody College of Technology
Mary Jackson Ellis, first African American schoolteacher in Minnesota.
Steve Foley (1959-2008), drummer for The Replacements
William Watts Folwell (1833-1929), first president of the University of Minnesota
Orville Freeman (1918-2003), 29th Governor of Minnesota, Former US Secretary of Agriculture
Abram M. Fridley (1817-1892), politician and capitalist, after whom Fridley, Minnesota was named
Frances A. Genter (1898-1992), Thoroughbred racehorse owner who won America's two most important races, the 1990 Kentucky Derby and Breeders' Cup Classic
Lewis A. Grant (1828-1918), American Civil War general and Assistant U.S. Secretary of War
Barton S. Hays (1826-1914), artist
Hubert H. Humphrey (1911-1978), Vice President of the United States, U.S. Senator
Muriel Humphrey (1912-1998), Second Lady of the United States, U.S. Senator
Isaac Wilson Joyce (1836-1905), Methodist bishop
William S. King (1828-1900), Republican U.S. Representative for Minnesota and journalist
Robert Koehler (1850-1917), German-born painter and art teacher
B. Robert Lewis (1931-1979), first African American Minnesota state senator
Charles M. Loring (1833-1922), Business man, co-founder of Lakewood Cemetery
John Hugh MacMillan (1928-2008), businessman
Bobby Marshall (1880-1958), first African American to play football in Western Conference (later known as the Big 10), one of the first African American NFL players
Forrest Mars Sr. (1904-1999), creator of M&M's candy
Frank Clarence Mars (1882-1934), creator of the Milky Way candy bar
Maggie Menzel (1853?-1872), First person buried at Lakewood Cemetery
Maren Michelet (1869-1932), first teacher of Norwegian in any public high school in the United States and promoter of Scandinavian culture.
George Mikan (1924-2005), professional basketball player
Karl Mueller (1963-2005), Soul Asylum bassist
Della Whitney Norton  (1840-1937), poet, author and Christian Scientist
Emil Oberhoffer (1867-1933), founder of the Minneapolis Symphony Orchestra
William Olander (1950-1989), senior curator at New Museum of Contemporary Art, New York City.
Floyd B. Olson (1891-1936), 22nd Governor of Minnesota
Bryan Ottoson (1978-2005), American Head Charge guitarist
Rudy Perpich (1928-1995), 34th and 36th Governor of Minnesota
Dave Peterson, coach of the United States men's national ice hockey team
John S. Pillsbury (1827-1901), eighth Governor of Minnesota, founder of the Pillsbury Company
Carl Pohlad (1915-2009), owner of the Minnesota Twins
James Sample (1910-1995), conductor of many orchestras including the Oregon Symphony
Sibyl Sanderson (1864-1903). famous American operatic soprano during the Parisian Belle Époque.
George M. Scott (1922-2006), MN Supreme Court Justice, Hennepin County Attorney, candidate for MN Governor
Clifford D. Simak (1904-1988), American science fiction writer
Lena Olive Smith, first black female lawyer
John Pillsbury Snyder (1888-1959), RMS Titanic survivor, and grandson of John S. Pillsbury
Nellie Snyder (1889-1983), RMS Titanic survivor and wife of John Pillsbury Snyder
Tiny Tim (1932-1996), singer, musician, and TV personality
Harriet G. Walker (1841-1917), president of Northwestern Hospital, now part of Allina Hospitals & Clinics
T. B. Walker (1840-1928), lumberman and art collector, founder of Walker Art Center
Paul Wellstone (1944-2002), US senator for Minnesota
Lyle Wright, (1898–1963) businessman, events promoter, United States Hockey Hall of Fame inductee

Photo gallery of notables

Other images

Notes

External links

Find a Grave.com listing for Lakewood Cemetery

Cemeteries in Minnesota
Protected areas of Hennepin County, Minnesota
Tourist attractions in Minneapolis
1872 establishments in Minnesota